Pular is a Fula language spoken primarily by the Fula people of Fouta Djallon, Guinea. It is also spoken in parts of Guinea-Bissau, Sierra Leone, and Senegal. There are a small number of speakers in Mali. Pular is spoken by 8.5 million Guineans, about 55% of the national population. This makes Pular the most widely spoken indigenous language in the country. Substantial numbers of Pular speakers have migrated to other countries in West Africa, notably Senegal.

Pular is not to be confused with Pulaar, another Fula language spoken natively in Guinea, Senegal, Mauritania, and western Mali (including the Futa Tooro region).

Pular is written in three alphabets: Adlam script, Ajami script and the Latin script.

Linguistic features

There are some particularities to this version of Fula, including:
Use of plural form for politeness (such as in German or French, unlike other varieties of Fula)
A number of separate verbal roots for politeness (these may exist only in Pular)
There is no initial consonant mutation from singular to plural verb forms as is the case in other varieties of Fula (there is in nominal forms, however)
In addition to the more standard long-form pronouns of Fula there are alternate forms in Pular (= hi(l) + pronoun). The table below summarizes these (question marks where the info is not complete):

Writing

Like other varieties of the Fula language, Pular was written before colonization in an Arabic-based orthography called Ajami. Today, Ajami remains prevalent in rural areas of Fouta Djallon, but Pular is mainly written in a Latin-based orthography, the so-called UNESCO orthography and the Adlam script, an indigenous alphabet created at the end of the 1980s by two brothers for the Fula language. Adlam have widely spread over the years in over 20 countries and is now about to overtake Latin and Ajami as the main written system of the Fulani people.

Up until the mid-1980s, Pular in Guinea was written with the Guinean languages alphabet that differed from that used in other countries.

Grammar

References

External links
 Miɗo Waawi Pular! Learner's guide to Pular (Fuuta Jallon) by Herb Caudill and Ousmane Diallo

Fula language
Fula language